Hold Your Man is a 1929 American comedy film directed by Emmett J. Flynn and written by Harold Shumate. The film stars Laura La Plante, Scott Kolk, Eugene Borden and Mildred Van Dorn. The film was released on September 15, 1929, by Universal Pictures.

Cast          
Laura La Plante as Mary
Scott Kolk as Jack
Eugene Borden as Beno
Mildred Van Dorn as Rhea
Walter F. Scott

References

External links
 

1929 films
1920s English-language films
Silent American comedy films
1929 comedy films
Universal Pictures films
Films directed by Emmett J. Flynn
American black-and-white films
1920s American films